Town Creek is a tributary of the Patuxent River in Saint Mary's County, Maryland.

Geography
The headwaters are located in the community of California, Maryland, on the east side of Maryland Route 235.

See also
 List of Maryland rivers
 Town Creek (Potomac River)
 Town Creek (Tred Avon River)

References

Tributaries of the Patuxent River
Rivers of Maryland
Rivers of St. Mary's County, Maryland